Smenospongia is a genus of demosponges in the family Thorectidae. 

Twelve new species of Korean Smenospongia were described in 2016. , the World Porifera database accepted the following species of Smenospongia:

References

Thorectidae